Radula perrottetii is a species of plant in genus Radula, a genus of liverworts. It is endemic in Japan. It contains the small molecule perrottetinene a cannabinoid and other metabolites of scientific interest including marchantin A.

References

Porellales
Flora of Japan